Sapello is an unincorporated community located in San Miguel County, New Mexico, United States. Sapello was a trading post along the Santa Fe Trail.

Sapello is a popular site for astronomers, as it has little light pollution at night. The minor planet 143641 Sapello was named for the community.

References

Unincorporated communities in San Miguel County, New Mexico
Unincorporated communities in New Mexico